Weismanniola is a genus of moths in the family Sesiidae, containing only one species Weismanniola agdistiformis, which is found in southern Russia and western Kazakhstan.

The larvae possibly feed on Artemisia species.

References

Sesiidae
Monotypic moth genera